Jutiapa Department is a department of Guatemala that borders along El Salvador and the Pacific Ocean. The capital is the city of Jutiapa. As of 2018, it has a population of 488,395. The department is divided into seventeen municipalities. Jutiapa is the country's southeasternmost department and officially the only department with no Mayan descendants native to the region. The main crops are sorghum, tobacco, onion and corn. The climate is dry. An important attraction is the cattle fair. It is at 405 m above sea level.

The population is ethnically "Ladino" (of European descent & non Mayan-indigenous), though in the northern regions of Jutiapa there are few descendants that once belonged to the now extinct Xinca population. The Xinca people were of non-Mayan descent. 

The coat of arms contains the cornucopia symbolizing Jutiapa as the barn of the East, supplying Guatemala with most of the grain consumed by the people. The horse and the cow represent the cattle; the books stand for educational and cultural advances. In the background sits La Cruz hill, the firm guardian of the departmental chief town, with the tower or antenna of a Jutiapa radio station. Behind the hill float the clouds, the sky and the sun of Jutiapa, "The Sun City". This coat of arms is placed on the flag between two laurel branches symbolizing the daily triumphs of the sons of Jutiapa. The flag is mainly white, showing in its center the coat of arms adapted and adroned, between two laurel branches.

Municipalities 

 Agua Blanca
 Asunción Mita
 Atescatempa
 Comapa
 Conguaco
 El Adelanto
 El Progreso
 Jalpatagua
 Jerez
 Jutiapa
 Moyuta
 Pasaco
 Quesada
 San José Acatempa
 Santa Catarina Mita
 Yupiltepeque
 Zapotitlán

References

External links
 Interactive department map

 
Departments of Guatemala